Rosa 'Strike It Rich',  (aka WEKbepmey ), is a grandiflora rose  cultivar, bred by Tom Carruth, and introduced into the United States by Weeks Rose Growers in 2007. The cultivar was awarded the Portland Gold Medal in 2010.

Description
'Strike It Rich' is a tall, upright shrub, 5 to 7 ft (152—200 cm) in height with a 2 to 3 ft (60—91 cm) spread. Blooms are large, 4—5 in (10—12 cm) in diameter, with 30 to 40 petals. Flowers are a double, cupped bloom form and are borne in large clusters. The flowers are yellow with copper and pink hues, and pink edges. The rose has a strong, spice  fragrance and medium, semi-glossy, dark green foliage.  'Strike It Rich' blooms in flushes throughout its growing season. The plant does well in USDA zone 5b and warmer.

Child plants
'Strike It Rich' was used to hybridize the following plants:
 Rosa 'Ch-Ching', (2008)
 Rosa 'Happy Go Lucky', (before 2013)

Awards  
 Portland Gold Medal, (2010)

See also
Garden roses
Rose Hall of Fame
List of Award of Garden Merit roses

References

Strike It Rich